Mutya ng Pilipinas 2009, the 41st edition of Mutya ng Pilipinas, Inc., was held on Aug. 9th, 2009 in Baler, Aurora. Jane Bañares, the winner of Mutya ng Pilipinas International 2009 and Jacqueline Schubert named as Mutya ng Pilipinas Tourism (Aurora) 2009.

Results
Color keys

Special Titles

Special Awards

Contestants

Withdrawals

Crossovers from Major National Pageants prior to this date
None

Post-Pageant Notes

 Mutya ng Pilipinas International (Intercontinental), Jane Bañares was unable to compete at Miss Intercontinental 2009. In replacement of Jane Bañares, last year's Mutya ng Pilipinas International, Jonavi Raisa Quiray had the opportunity of competing at Miss Tourism International 2009 in Kuala Lumpur, Malaysia but was unplaced
 Mutya ng Pilipinas Tourism, Jacqueline Schubert replaced Jane Bañares and competed at Miss Intercontinental 2009 in Minsk, Belarus but was unplaced, Miss Schubert was supposed to compete at Miss Tourism International in Malaysia but the organizers switched her with Miss Quiray since she grew up in Europe and is more familiar with the culture
 Mutya #1, Athena Mae Imperial went on to win Miss Philippines Earth 2011 and eventually Miss Earth 2011 Water/2nd runner-up held in MQuezon City, Philippines

References

External links
 Official Mutya ng Pilipinas website
  Mutya ng Pilipinas 2009 is on!

2009
2009 beauty pageants
2009 in the Philippines